Terry Hill (born 22 January 1972) is an Australian former professional rugby league footballer who played as a  in the 1990s and 2000s. He played in the NRL for the South Sydney Rabbitohs, Eastern Suburbs, Western Suburbs Magpies, Manly-Warringah Sea Eagles and the Wests Tigers as well as representative football for New South Wales and Australia. He is also well known for his promotional television work with Lowes Menswear.

Background
Hill was born in Newtown, New South Wales, Australia.

Playing career
Hill became embroiled in the "External and Internal Draft" system in the 1991 season when, after agreeing to a playing and employment deal with the Western Suburbs Magpies, he was drafted from the Internal Draft pool by Eastern Suburbs. Hill's initial appeal was overturned and he eventually agreed to a three-year contract with Easts. By the end of 1991 the High Court had overturned the draft system and in 1992 Hill was given a release and he was able to move on to Western Suburbs Magpies.

Hill moved to the Manly-Warringah Sea Eagles in 1994. At the end of the 1994 NSWRL season, he went on the 1994 Kangaroo tour. He was the season's top try-scorer in the ARL half of 1997's split competition.

At the beginning of 2004, Hill had signed for another season with the South Sydney Rabbitohs but a groin injury during pre-season training caused him to retire. By the end of the year, Hill was training once more with another former club, Manly-Warringah. He went on to make 16 appearances for Manly in the 2005 season.

Hill was called out of retirement in 2006 to play rugby union for the Central Coast Waves. He suffered a knee injury during the Grand Final of the NSW Country Caldwell Cup and was unable to take any part in the Waves' 2006 Shute Shield campaign.

Representative career
Hill was selected to represent New South Wales in State of Origin series as a centre in six series: 
 Game III of the 1993 State of Origin series
 All games of the 1995 State of Origin series
 All games in the 1997 State of Origin series
 All games in the 1998 State of Origin series
 All games in the 1999 State of Origin series
 Game I of the 2000 State of Origin series

Hill earned selection for the Australian national team on nine occasions from 1994 to 1998, scoring eight tries. He was a 1994 Kangaroo Tourist before playing in his first international against New Zealand in 1995. Hill was reported for head-butting in this match and was suspended for four weeks, missing the following two tests.

Career highlights
 First Grade Debut: 1990 - Round 1 South Sydney vs Bulldogs at Sydney Football Stadium, 17 March
 Representative Debut: 1993, City vs Country Origin, 23 April at Parramatta Stadium. Started in the centres for City Origin.
 State of Origin Debut: 1993, game 3 at Lang Park, 31 May. Started from the bench.
 International Selection: 1995, Australia vs New Zealand, game I at Suncorp Stadium 23 June, scoring one try
 Premierships: 1996 Grand Final - member of the Manly-Warringah team that defeated St. George Dragons, 20–8

Coaching career
Following his retirement from professional rugby league, Hill has been coaching teams in the New South Wales Country Rugby League. Formerly with the Umina Bunnies, he has been appointed as head coach at the Kincumber Rugby League Football Club in the Central Coast Division for 2008.

References

Footnotes

External links
 Terry Hill at Rugby League Tables

1972 births
Rugby league players from Sydney
Manly Warringah Sea Eagles players
Wests Tigers players
South Sydney Rabbitohs players
Sydney Roosters players
New South Wales City Origin rugby league team players
Australian rugby league coaches
Australian rugby league players
Australia national rugby league team players
Western Suburbs Magpies players
Living people
Rugby league centres